Corbreuse is a commune in the Essonne department in Île-de-France in northern France.

Inhabitants of Corbreuse are known as Corbreusois.

See also
Communes of the Essonne department

References
Mayors of Essonne Association

External links

Land use (IAURIF) 

Communes of Essonne